Sadr ad-Dīn Abu'l Ḥasan ʿAlī Ibn Abī  al-ʻIzz was a 14th-century Arab Muslim scholar and jurist who served as a qadi in Damascus and Egypt. He is best known for authoring a commentary on al-Tahawi's creedal treatise Al-Aqidah al-Tahawiyyah, which is popular with Salafis.

Biography 
According to Ibn Hajar al-Asqalani, Ibn Abi al-'Izz was born on 12 Dhu al-Hijjah 1331 CE/731 AH, hailing from a family that were staunch adherents of the Hanafi school of jurisprudence. He was a disciple of Ibn Kathir, a student of Ibn Taymiyyah. He was appointed as a judge in his hometown of Damascus, later accepting a judgeship in Egypt before returning to Damascus. Al-Sakhawi mentions his teacher, Ibn Adiry, as one of al-'Izz's students. 

During his latter tenure as a judge in Damascus, al-'Izz became embroiled in controversy due to his views that Allah has a direction, Hell is not eternal and his censure of Ibn Aybuk's qaṣĩdah (poem), whose contents he held to constitute disbelief. His judgeship was subsequently revoked, and as he was legally unbeliever in the eyes of his adversaries, his marriage was void so they took his wife and married her to one of their own, until an individual named al-Nāṣirī raised the issue to the authorities, resulting in al-ʻIzz's position being restored. He remained at his position until his death there in 1390 CE/792 AH.

Legacy 
Ibn Abi al-Izz's sharh on al-Tahawi's creedal treatise al-Aqidah al-Tahawiyyah proved popular with members of the later Salafi movement, who regard it as a true representation of the work free from Maturidi influence, thus showing it to be in accordance with Salafi creed. Numerous Salafi scholars have produced supercommentaries and annotations on the sharh, including Abd al-Aziz ibn Baz, Muhammad Nasiruddin al-Albani and Saleh al-Fawzan, and it is taught as a standard text at the Islamic University of Madinah.

The sharh is shunned by Maturidis, who view it as a misrepresentation of al-Tahawi's work and in conflict with their creed. The Maturidi scholar Ibrahim al-Yaqubi suspected al-'Izz of being a pseudonym for Ibn al-Qayyim due to similarities between the positions held in the sharh and those of Ibn al-Qayyim's teacher, Ibn Taymiyyah. Muhammad Zahid al-Kawthari contested the existence of al-‘Izz altogether and posited that his biographical details were recent interpolations or false attributions, arguing the sharh was the work of an anthropomorphist who could not have been Hanafi.

Ibn Abī al-ʿIzz wrote the as yet unedited al-Tahdhīb li-Dhihn al-Labīb.

References 

Hanafis
Atharis
14th-century Muslim scholars of Islam
1390 deaths
1331 births
14th-century jurists